Zaurbek Musaevich Baysangurov (born 2 March 1985) is a Russian former professional boxer who competed from 2004 to 2014. He is a former WBO and IBO light middleweight champion, having held the IBO title twice between 2010–2015 and the WBO title between 2011 and 2013. He held the European title between 2007–2008 and the WBA Inter-Continental title between 2009 and 2010. Zaurbek is an ethnic Chechen from the teip Terloy.

Amateur career
In 2001, Baysangurov won the gold medal at the 2001 Russian Cadet National Championships in Rostov in June, he then won the gold medal at the 2001 Cadet European Championships in Liverpool, England in July, and went on to win a bronze medal at the 2001 Cadet World Championships in Baku, Azerbaijan in October.

In 2002, Baysangurov won the gold medal at the 2002 Russian Junior National Championships in Tyumen in May, and went on to win a bronze medal at the 2002 Junior World Championships in Santiago de Cuba in September.

In 2003, Baysangurov won the gold medal at the 2003 Junior European Championships in Warsaw, Poland in August.

Amateur highlights
2002 Junior World Championships bronze medalist.
 Defeated Aslan Bayramov (Azerbaijan) 
 Defeated Hwang Ryong (South Korea)
 Defeated Juan de Dios Navarro (Mexico)
 Lost to Vilier Quinones (Cuba)
2003 Junior European Championships gold medalist.
 Defeated Mindaugas Spakauskas (Lithuania)
 Defeated Dian Petrov (Bulgaria)
 Defeated Stefan Dragomir (Romania)
 Defeated Sergiy Derevyanchenko (Ukraine)
 Defeated Rakhib Beylarov (Azerbaijan)

Professional career
Zaurbek Baysangurov made his professional debut in 2004 at the age of 20. He won the IBF Youth middleweight title in 2005, and held the IBF Youth light middleweight title from 2005 to 2006, and amassed a record of 14 wins with all but two by stoppage.

On 23 September 2006, Baysangurov faced Marco Antonio Rubio for the vacant WBC International title in Kyiv, Ukraine. Baysangurov was dropped by Rubio in the first round but bounced back to win the fight by unanimous decision outboxing his opponent to win the remaining eleven rounds on the judges' scorecards.

In May 2007, the EBU announced Baysangurov would face off against French boxer Hussein Bayram for the vacant European light middleweight title. On 7 July, he won the competitive bout by unanimous decision in Cologne, Germany. Two judges awarded the fight 114-113 and another 115-113 for Baysangurov.

In December 2008 he lost via an upset 5th-round KO to former The Contender star Cornelius Bundrage.

Professional boxing record

References

External links
 
World junior championships results 2002
Bio
Doghouse article

1985 births
Living people
Chechen martial artists
Russian people of Chechen descent
Chechen people
Light-middleweight boxers
Middleweight boxers
Russian male boxers
World light-middleweight boxing champions
International Boxing Organization champions
World Boxing Organization champions